Henicops maculatus is a species of centipede in the Henicopidae family. It was first described in 1845 by British entomologist George Newport.

Distribution
The species occurs in south-eastern Australia and New Zealand. The type locality is Tasmania.

Behaviour
The centipedes are solitary terrestrial predators, that inhabit plant litter and soil.

References

 

 
maculatus
Centipedes of Australia
Centipedes of New Zealand
Fauna of Tasmania
Fauna of Victoria (Australia)
Animals described in 1845
Taxa named by George Newport
Fauna of New South Wales